The 1999 Michigan Wolverines football team represented the University of Michigan in the 1999 NCAA Division I-A football season.  The team's head coach was Lloyd Carr.  The Wolverines played their home games at Michigan Stadium. That year Michigan Wolverines football competed in the Big Ten Conference in almost all intercollegiate sports including men's college football.   The 1999 Wolverines finished the season with a 10–2 record (6–2 in the Big Ten) and defeated the Alabama Crimson Tide in the 2000 Orange Bowl.  The team was ranked #5 in both the final coaches and AP polls.  The team was led by All-American and Academic All-American Rob Renes and his co-captains Tom Brady and Steve Hutchinson.

Schedule

Statistical achievements
Marcus Knight tied Desmond Howard (1991) and Anthony Carter (1981) for the school record with three consecutive 100-yard reception games. Braylon Edwards would post four in 2003 and 2004. Tom Brady concluded his career by breaking his own single-game pass completions record with the current record of 34 against Alabama in the January 1, 2000 Orange Bowl.  The game marked the tenth 4-touchdown passing performance in school history, a feat that is still unsurpassed by any Michigan quarterback.  For the season, he tied his own single-season completions record (214) set the prior season and broken by John Navarre in 2002.  He also set the single-season passing yards per game record of 215.5, surpassing Jim Harbaugh's 209.9 in 1986 and broken by Navarre in 2002. He broke Todd Collins' career 200-yard game record of 14 set in 1994 by one, a record broken by Navarre during his junior season in 2002.  The team set the current NCAA single-season all-time home attendance record with an average of 111,175.

Roster

Rankings

Team players in the NFL
The following players were claimed in the 2000 NFL Draft.

 Running back Anthony Thomas was selected by the Chicago Bears in the 2001 NFL Draft.
 Quarterback Drew Henson played professional baseball for the New York Yankees and played professional football for the Dallas Cowboys and the Detroit Lions.  Henson was selected by the Cowboys in the 2003 NFL Draft.

Awards and honors
Co-captains: Tom Brady, Steve Hutchinson, Rob Renes
All-Americans: Rob Renes
Academic All-American: Renes (first team)
All-Conference: Steve Hutchinson, David Terrell, Rob Renes, Ian Gold, Tommy Hendricks, Jeff Backus
Most Valuable Player: Tom Brady
Meyer Morton Award: Grady Brooks
John Maulbetsch Award: Drew Henson
Frederick Matthei Award: Anthony Thomas
Arthur Robinson Scholarship Award: Dhani Jones
Dick Katcher Award: Rob Renes
Hugh Rader Jr. Award: Jeff Backus
Robert P. Ufer Award: Marcus Knight
Roger Zatkoff Award: Ian Gold

Coaching staff
Head coach: Lloyd Carr
Assistant coaches: Teryl Austin, Erik Campbell, Mike DeBord, Jim Herrmann, Brady Hoke, Fred Jackson, Terry Malone, Bobby Morrison, Stan Parrish
Staff: Scott Draper, Mark Ouimet, Kelly Cox
Trainer: Paul Schmidt
Managers: Brian Buckler, Greg Deutch, Dave Eklund, Bill Hausman, Craig Hisey, Lisa Kuzma, Chris Lemaster, Paul Levi, Sean Merrill, Taylor Morgan, David Peabody, Craig Podolski, Brian Retusek, Victor Soto, Ryan Staton

References

External links
  1999 Football Team -- Bentley Historical Library, University of Michigan Athletics History

Michigan
Michigan Wolverines football seasons
Orange Bowl champion seasons
Michigan Wolverines football